Stansbury Hall was a building on the Downtown Campus of West Virginia University. It was named after Harry Stansbury (died 1966), a former WVU Athletic Director. Opened in 1929 as the WVU Field House, just to the southwest of "Old" Mountaineer Field, this was the home of WVU basketball until 1970, when the WVU Coliseum was opened. This was the home floor during the days of Hot Rod Hundley and Jerry West. It hosted the Southern Conference men's basketball tournament in 1953. While the home venue of WVU basketball, the team compiled a record of 370–81 (.820) when playing there. In October 1973, it was renamed to honor Stansbury.

Prior to demolition, the building was the home of the Philosophy Department, the Statistics Department, the Program for Humanities, the Program for Religious Studies, the Center for Service and Learning, and the Office of International Programs. Army and Air Force ROTC programs were also housed here. Stansbury's use prior to demolition also retained some vestige of its athletic history; the remaining arena floor was often used by intramural and "pickup" soccer and basketball games, while a gymnasium offering personal-training services was housed elsewhere in the building.

On February 10, 2017, WVU announced plans to demolish Stansbury Hall and replace it with a new building for the WVU College of Business and Economics.

Demolition began August 2019. The building to take its place, Reynolds Hall, is scheduled to be completed June 2022, and is going to be a new facility for WVU's John Chambers Business and Economics College.

References

Basketball venues in West Virginia
Defunct indoor arenas in the United States
Defunct college basketball venues in the United States
West Virginia Mountaineers basketball
West Virginia University campus
University and college academic buildings in the United States
Neoclassical architecture in West Virginia
Defunct sports venues in West Virginia
Indoor arenas in West Virginia
Demolished buildings and structures in West Virginia
Buildings and structures demolished in 2019